Nandalar  (நண்டலாறு) is a branch river of Cauvery River and flowing between Tiruvarur district and Mayiladuthurai district of the Indian state of Tamil Nadu. It act as a border line for Thiruvarur and Mayiladuthurai Districts.

Meaning
Nandalaru => Nandu(Crab)+Kal(Rock)+Aaru Crab's Fossil in Rock found in this river. So this river got the name as Nandalaru.

Origin
 Nandalar  is a branch of River Cauvery.Nandalar river split from Cauvery near Kumbakonam and it flown through Kumbakonam, Komal, Avazhikkarai, Nallaathur. It drained in Bay of Bengal between Chandrapadi and Tharangambadi

References

See also 
List of rivers of Tamil Nadu

Rivers of Tamil Nadu
Tiruvarur district
Rivers of India